A statue of John A. Macdonald by George Edward Wade was installed in Kingston, Ontario, until 2021.

Relocation
In 2021 the statue was removed from its original spot at City Park to Cataraqui Cemetery, where Macdonald is buried.

References

John A. Macdonald
Relocated buildings and structures in Canada
Statues removed in 2021
Sculptures of men in Canada
Statues in Canada